Lydia Prugger (born 22 January 1969) from Ramsau am Dachstein is an Austrian ski mountaineer.

Prugger was inspired ski mountaineering by her father and later by her husband, who is a trained mountain guide. She has held the women's record at the Hochwurzen-Berglauf since 2006, and has been member of the national team since the foundation of the ASKIMO.

Selected results 
 2006: 1st and course record, Hochwurzen-Berglauf
 2007:
 1st, Hochwurzen-Berglauf
 1st, Lesachtal ski mountaineering run
 1st, Loser ski mountaineering race
 3rd, Knappen-Königs-Trophy, Bischofshofen 
 4th, Mountain-Attack tour
 2008:
 1st, Rofan Xtreme within the Austrian Championship
 1st and record at the new course, Hochwurzen-Berglauf
 1st, Laserzlauf
 1st, Lesachtal  ski mountaineering run
 4th, World Championship vertical race
 10th, World Championship single race
 2010:
 3rd, World Championship relay race (together with Michaela Eßl and Veronika Swidrak)
 5th, World Championship team race (together with Michaela Eßl)
 6th, World Championship vertical race
 7th, World Championship combination ranking
 2nd, Mountain Attack tour
 2011:
 6th, World Championship relay (together with Michaela Eßl and Veronika Swidrak)
 8th, World Championship vertical race
 2nd, Champ Or Cramp

Patrouille des Glaciers 

 2010: 4th, (and 3rd in the "international civilian women" ranking), together with Veronika Swidrak and Michaela Eßl

External links 
 Lydia Prugger at skimountaineering.org

References 

1969 births
Living people
Austrian female ski mountaineers
21st-century Austrian women